Parma Senior High School (alternatively known as PSH or Parma High School), is one of three public high schools in the Parma City School District in Parma, Ohio. The school is a member of the Northeast Ohio Conference. The Parma Board of Education was moved into the high school in Fall 2006.

Parma Senior High School athletic teams are known as the Redmen and compete in the Great Lakes Conference.

The school will be closing after the 2022-2023 school year.

History
It was formerly the Parma Schaaf High School.

Alumni
John Adams (1969), a Cleveland Indians fan known as "The Drummer" who plays a bass drum at nearly every Indians game at Progressive Field
 Bob Brugge (1944), former National Football League player for the Cleveland Browns
Les Horvath former National Football League player and Heisman Trophy winner at Ohio State University.  Attended Parma Schaaf High from 1936 to 1938
Biagio Messina, filmmaker, TV producer, and actor known for playing the role of Marc Cram on Kenan & Kel. Has also produced over 100 hours of film and television.
Ron Labinski (1955), architect who was a founding partner in HOK Sport, and was instrumental in the design of sports venues worldwide
Mike Ozdowski (1973), former National Football League player for the Baltimore Colts
Rich Rollins, former Major League Baseball player 
Alan Ruck, actor (famous for his role as Cameron Frye in Ferris Bueller's Day Off.
Frank A. Herda (1966), Medal of Honor 1968

References

External links
Parma Senior High School Home Page
Parma Senior High School Alumni Association

High schools in Cuyahoga County, Ohio
Parma, Ohio
Public high schools in Ohio